Renato Fabrizio Garín González (born 30 May 1986) is a Chilean lawyer who was member of the Chilean Constitutional Convention.

On 12 January 2021, Garín resigned to the Chamber of Deputies of Chile to run for the Constitutional Convention.

References

External links

Living people
1986 births
21st-century Chilean lawyers
21st-century Chilean politicians
University of Chile alumni
Alumni of the University of Oxford
Pontifical Catholic University of Chile alumni
Democratic Revolution politicians
Members of the Chilean Constitutional Convention
People from Santiago